The list of ship commissionings in 1992 includes a chronological list of all ships commissioned in 1992.


See also 

1992
 Ship commissionings